Harald Pichler (born 18 June 1987) is an Austrian footballer who plays for SPG Silz/Mötz in the Tiroler Liga.

References

1987 births
Sportspeople from Klagenfurt
Footballers from Carinthia (state)
Living people
Austrian footballers
Association football defenders
Austrian Football Bundesliga players
2. Liga (Austria) players
FC Red Bull Salzburg players
SK Rapid Wien players
SV Ried players
SV Grödig players
FC Wacker Innsbruck (2002) players